Moryakov is a rural locality (a settlement) and the administrative center of Nikolo-Komarovsky Selsoviet, Kamyzyaksky District, Astrakhan Oblast, Russia. The population was 255 as of 2010.

Geography 
Moryakov is located 35 km northwest of Kamyzyak (the district's administrative centre) by road. Nikolskoye is the nearest rural locality.

References 

Rural localities in Kamyzyaksky District